Whittlestone Head railway station served the hamlet of Whittlestone Head, Lancashire, England, in 1848 on the Blackburn, Darwen and Bolton Railway.

History
The station was opened on 12 June 1848 by the Bolton, Blackburn, Clitheroe and West Yorkshire Railway. It was a very short-lived station, only being open for one and a half months before closing on 1 August 1848. It was replaced by the current  station.

References

Disused railway stations in Lancashire
Railway stations in Great Britain opened in 1848
Railway stations in Great Britain closed in 1848
1848 establishments in England
1848 disestablishments in England